Knight School is a comedy drama series shown on Children's ITV and made by Granada Television. It was written and created by Mark Billingham and Peter Cocks, who also starred in the series. Two series were broadcast between 2 September 1997 and 15 October 1998.

Overview
Knight School was promoted by Granada Television as "Grange Hill meets Blackadder". Set in the Middle Ages, the action centred on St Cuthbert's Academy, an exclusive school for young knights. The story began with the school deciding to take a scholarship boy. The lucky boy, and the series' hero, was Wally Scrope, a common but loveable village idiot. Over the course of the series, Scrope battles for the affections of Lady Elizabeth de Gossard (played by Grange Hill girl-next-door Amy Phillips), head girl of the nearby St Catherine's School for Damsels, and he has a rival for his affections in the form of St Cuthbert's head boy and school bully Sir Roger de Courcey.

Despite being set in the Middle Ages, there were many in-jokes to make Knight School relevant to a late 1990s audience. For one, the school was run by a progressive headmaster, Sir Hubert Grindcobbe, whose idea it was to take on a scholarship boy. His power-hungry deputy was the feared Sir Baldwin De'Ath, who longed for the top job, and made good use of De Courcey as his personal henchman. And in a bid to impress Lady Elizabeth, Wally gets her tickets to see her favourite boy band, "MinstrelZone". Unfortunately the tickets are fake, having been obtained from Wally's spiv cousin (pre-EastEnders Shane Ritchie), but they still get into the concert.

Knight School sent up the Spice Girls phenomenon in Series 2 by having Lady Elizabeth and Eunice kidnapped on the school holiday and forced to perform in a new girl band, "The Herb Girls".

Series 1 of Knight School was shot with a filmic effect and had impressive production values. Come the second series, new producer Yvon Grace brought several changes to the style of the show; the filmic effect was lost in favour of a standard VT look, the impressive male vocal theme song was superseded by a less impressive rendition played on kazoos. A couple of principal characters were recast. But there was also a guest appearance by EastEnders stalwart John Altman as evil wizard Wormwood, and comedian Ted Robbins as the DJ at the school's end-of-term "disco".

Cast

Staff
Peter Jeffrey – Sir Hubert Grindcobbe
Roger Lloyd-Pack – Sir Baldwin de'Ath, also Ben D'Izir (Series 2)
Joanna McCallum – Mistress Genevieve Gently
Mark Billingham – Scrubbe
Peter Cocks – Grockle
Anne Orwin – Mrs Scabbe (Series 2)
Ramsay Gilderdale – Jasper Crouchback
Christopher Guard – Clovis Sackbutt (Series 1)
Geoffrey Bayldon – Dr Spencer DePenser (Series 1)

Pupils
Stuart Rooker – Wally Scrope
Anthony Hamblin – Sir Arthur Melton-Mowbray
Blake Ritson – Sir Roger de Courcey
Amy Phillips – Lady Elizabeth de Gossard
Susie Williams – Eunice Spongge-Baggeley (Series 1)
Carly Hamilton – Eunice Spongge-Baggeley (Series 2)
Robert Pollard – Alf Scrope (Series 2)
Lucy Bell – Lady Amelia de Gossard (Series 2)
Thomas Hudson – Wykeham (Series 2)
Steven Townsley – Sir Montegue (Series 1&2)

External links
 BBC Comedy Guide: Knight School
 

1997 British television series debuts
1998 British television series endings
1990s British children's television series
ITV children's television shows
Fictional schools
English-language television shows
Television series by ITV Studios
Television shows produced by Granada Television